The 2019–20 VCU Rams men's basketball team represented Virginia Commonwealth University during the 2019–20 NCAA Division I men's basketball season. The Rams were by Mike Rhoades in his third season as head coach at VCU. The Rams played their home games at Stuart C. Siegel Center in Richmond, Virginia as members of the Atlantic 10 Conference (A-10).

VCU opened the season with a 6–0 record, making it the first time in program history for the Rams to win their first six games, and were ranked for the first time in three seasons. In February, however, VCU lost seven of their final nine games, giving the program its worst losing streak since the 1997–98 season. This caused the program to finish with a regular season record of 18–13 and 8–10 in conference play. VCU was seeded eighth in the 2020 Atlantic 10 men's basketball tournament, and were slated to play UMass in the second round. The game, and the tournament, was cancelled due to the COVID-19 pandemic. VCU finished the season 18–13, making it the 20th consecutive season VCU finished with a winning overall record.

Previous season

The Rams, surpassing preseason expectations, won the A-10 regular season, posting a 25–8 record and 16–2 record in Atlantic 10 play (their best ever in that league) and earned an at-large bid into the 2019 NCAA Division I men's basketball tournament. There they lost to UCF in the opening round of the tournament.

Offseason

Departures

2019 recruiting class

Roster

Schedule

|-
!colspan=12 style=| Exhibition

|-
!colspan=12 style=| Non-conference regular season
|-

|-
!colspan=12 style=|Atlantic 10 regular season
|-

|-
!colspan=12 style=| Atlantic 10 tournament
|- style="background:#dddddd"
| style="text-align:center"|Mar 12, 202012:00 pm, NBCSN
|align="center"| (8)
| vs. (9) UMass
| colspan=5 style="text-align:center"|Cancelled due to the COVID-19 pandemic
| style="text-align:center"|Barclays CenterBrooklyn, NY

Rankings

*AP does not release post-NCAA Tournament rankings

References

VCU
VCU Rams men's basketball seasons
VCU Rams men's basketball
VCU Rams men's basketball
VCU Rams men's basketball